The 1969 Men's Tour includes International Tennis Federation tournaments that were not affiliated to either World Championship Tennis circuit or the National Tennis League. The tour began on 3 December 1968 in Madras, India and finished on 29 December in New Orleans, United States.

Calendar

Legend

January

February

March

April

May

June

July

August

September

October

November

December

References

Sources
 MacCambridge, Michael (2012). Lamar Hunt: A Life in Sports. Andrews McMeel Publishing. ISBN 9781449423391.
 
 
 Robertson, Max (1974). Encyclopaedia of Tennis. Allen & Unwin. .

External links
 http://www.tennisarchives.com/Tournaments 1969
 https://app.thetennisbase.com/1969 Season Main tournaments

ITF Independent tour